Quanitta 'Queen' Underwood (born May 8, 1984) is an American boxer. She entered the sport at nineteen when she wandered into Cappy's Boxing Gym and Club. She competed for the United States at the 2012 Summer Olympics.

References 

American women boxers
Boxers from Washington (state)
Sportspeople from Seattle
1984 births
Living people
Boxers at the 2012 Summer Olympics
Olympic boxers of the United States
Lightweight boxers
21st-century American women